The dilruba (also spelt dilrupa) is a bowed musical instrument originating in India. It is slightly larger than an esraj and has a larger, square resonance box. The dilruba holds particular importance in Sikh history.

It became more widely known outside India in the 1960s through use in songs by Western artists, such as the Beatles during their psychedelic phase (most notably in the song "Within You Without You").

Etymology
The name of the instrument derives from the Persianized Hindustani word دلربا/दिलरुबा (dilrubā), literally meaning "that which ravishes or steals the heart."

History
The traditional story is that the dilruba was invented around 300 years ago by the 10th Sikh Guru, Guru Gobind Singh, who based it on the much older and much heavier taus. His innovations made it more convenient for the Sikh army (the khalsa) to carry the instrument on horseback. 

There is some doubt in the research community about the truth of the traditional origin story described above. Some traditional kirtan bearers, such as Bhai Avtar Singh Raagi, have clarified the history of the dilruba's creation being tied to the patronage of Maharaja Bhupinder Singh and created by Mahant Gajja Singh.

After the introduction of the harmonium to the Indian Subcontinent by the British Raj, the dilruba fell out of use due to its comparatively steeper learning curve. In more recent times, it has had a resurgence, accompanying ragis in the Harmandir Sahib (Golden Temple) since 2006, and becoming more commonly taught within India and around the world.

Construction
The instrument has a medium-sized sitar-like neck with about 20 metal frets, which are meant to guide the hand placement of the player. The neck holds a long wooden rack of 12-15 sympathetic strings. The dilruba has four main strings, all made of metal. Only the leftmost string is bowed. The soundboard is a stretched piece of goatskin similar to what is found on a sarangi. Sometimes, the instrument has a gourd affixed to the top for balance or for tone enhancement. The instrument can be rested between or on the knees while the player kneels, or on the floor just in front of the player, with the neck of the instrument leaning on the left shoulder of the player. It is played using a bow in the right hand, with the other hand moving along the strings above the frets longitudinally. The player may slide the note up or down to achieve the portamento, or meend, as is characteristic of Indian music.

References

External links
 Indian Musical Instruments

Indian musical instruments
 Sikh music